The Vista Hermosa Natural Park is an urban public park located in Echo Park, Los Angeles, immediately west of Civic Center, Los Angeles. The park includes walking trails, streams, meadows, oak savannahs, picnic grounds, a nature-themed playground, and a soccer field.

The $15-million park was opened on July 19, 2008 and was the first to open in Downtown Los Angeles in over 100 years. The park is managed as a partnership among the Los Angeles Unified School District, the City of Los Angeles, and the Mountains Recreation and Conservation Authority (MRCA).

See also 

 Echo Park, Los Angeles
 List of parks in Los Angeles

References

External links 

 Official website

Echo Park, Los Angeles
Parks in Los Angeles
2008 establishments in California